Tysvær or Tysværvåg is a village in Tysvær municipality in Rogaland county, Norway. Tysvær Church is located in the village, serving the southwest portion of the municipality.

References

Villages in Rogaland
Tysvær